Michigan Services are three Amtrak passenger rail routes connecting Chicago, Illinois with the Michigan cities of Grand Rapids, Port Huron, and Detroit, and stations en route. The group is a component of the Midwest Regional Rail Initiative.

The Michigan Services routes are:
 (364/365): Chicago to Port Huron, Michigan
 (370/371): Chicago to Grand Rapids, Michigan 
 (350/351/352/353/354/355): Chicago to Pontiac, Michigan

The routes carried 780,549 passengers during fiscal year 2018.

Up until fiscal year 2014, the State of Michigan only subsidized the operations of the Pere Marquette and Blue Water at a cost of $8 million in fiscal year 2014.  Starting fiscal year 2014, the state took on the costs of operations for the Wolverine pushing the state subsidy to $25 million.

No checked baggage service is available on Michigan Services routes.

History 
When Amtrak was founded in 1971, five private companies provided inter-city passenger service in Michigan: the Baltimore & Ohio (B&O), the Chesapeake & Ohio (C&O), the Grand Trunk Western, the Norfolk & Western, and Penn Central. Services provided:

Upon taking over national passenger rail service on May 1, 1971, Amtrak discontinued almost all of these, keeping just two round-trips on the Penn Central's Chicago—Detroit line. Detroit lost its direct connections to St Louis, Cincinnati, Buffalo and the Canadian province of Ontario. On its first new timetable, issued on November 14, 1971, Amtrak bestowed names on these trains: the Wolverine and the St. Clair. In mid-May Amtrak announced a Toledo, Ohio—Detroit connection to the new Chicago—New York Lake Shore with financial support from the state of Michigan; this train was canceled before it ran because of poor track conditions between the two cities.

Turboliners 

On April 10, 1975, Amtrak introduced French-built Turboliner equipment to the Michigan route. Amtrak added a third round-trip to the corridor on April 27. A pool of three Turboliner trainsets served the route, and the three round-trip pairs were numbered 350—355, which are still in use today. Amtrak dropped the individual train names and rebranded all three Turboliner, in common with similar services to St. Louis, Missouri and Milwaukee, Wisconsin. The new equipment led to massive gains in ridership, topping 340,000 in 1975 and 370,000 in 1976.

The Turboliners became a victim of their own success. Although fast (and flashy), they were unable to reach their design speed of  because of the poor quality of the Penn Central track in Michigan. The five-car fixed consists had a maximum capacity of 292 passengers, which was often not enough. Starting in March 1976 Amtrak began replacing some of the Turboliners with conventional equipment, including new Amfleet coaches. Individual names returned to the corridor, with the heretofore unnamed third train becoming the Twilight Limited. The last Turboliners left the corridor in 1981.

Blue Water 

Amtrak restored service to the Grand Trunk Western northeast of Battle Creek on September 15, 1974, with the inauguration of the Blue Water. This train originated at Port Huron and served Lapeer, Flint, Durand, and East Lansing before joining the Chicago—Detroit trains at Battle Creek and continuing to Chicago. The state of Michigan spent $1 million on track rehabilitation. Amtrak renamed the train the Blue Water Limited on October 26, 1975, and it used Turboliners 1976—1981.

Michigan, Amtrak and the Canadian province of Ontario had discussed restoring Port Huron—Toronto service since 1973; this finally occurred on October 31, 1982 with the extension of the Blue Water Limited, which was renamed the International Limited (later shortened to International). Amtrak and Via Rail, the state-supported Canadian rail company, jointly operated the International until April 25, 2004, when cross-border service was discontinued: massive border delays post-September 11 led to falling ridership. Amtrak and Michigan agreed to truncate service at Port Huron and bring back the old Blue Water.

Pontiac and Toledo 

On August 3, 1980, Amtrak extended the St Clair, the midday Chicago—Detroit train, to Toledo, Ohio. The train was renamed the Lake Cities and continued to use Turboliner trainsets until mid-1981. The Lake Cities schedule allowed both east- and westbound connections with the Chicago—New York Lake Shore Limited, eliminating the need for Michigan travelers to backtrack through Chicago. Budget cuts led Amtrak to discontinue service to Toledo on April 1, 1995.

Amtrak extended the Wolverine and Twilight Limited to Pontiac on May 5, 1994. With this change service began at a new station in Detroit's New Center. Although the Michigan Central Station in Corktown, Detroit had closed on January 6, 1988, trains continued to stop at a temporary platform just east of the old station. Besides Pontiac, new stations were opened at Royal Oak and Birmingham. The Lake Cities also began serving Pontiac after the end of Toledo service in 1995.

Pere Marquette 

Amtrak considered two routes for a Chicago—Grand Rapids train: the Chesapeake and Ohio Railway (ex-Pere Marquette Railway), which ran along the Lake Michigan coastline and joined the main Chicago—Detroit line at Porter, Indiana; and a Conrail (ex-Pennsylvania Railroad) route via Kalamazoo. Although the Conrail route was faster, a dispute over costs led to the selection of the C&O route. Service began August 5, 1984, with stops at Grand Rapids, Holland, Bangor, St. Joseph, New Buffalo and Hammond-Whiting. Like the Blue Water, the Pere Marquette receives financial support from the state of Michigan.

Track

The tracks used were originally part of the Pennsylvania Railroad, New York Central Railroad, Grand Trunk Railway and Pere Marquette Railway systems, and are now owned by CSX, Norfolk Southern, the Canadian National Railway, Conrail and Amtrak. The following lines are used:

Blue Water
Grand Trunk Western Railway (GT), Battle Creek, Michigan (on the Michigan Central Railroad east of Kalamazoo) to Port Huron, Michigan, now CN

Pere Marquette
Pere Marquette Railway, Porter, Indiana to Grand Rapids, Michigan, now CSX

Wolverine
Pittsburgh, Fort Wayne and Chicago Railway (PRR), Chicago, Illinois to Whiting, Indiana, now NS
Lake Shore and Michigan Southern Railway (NYC), Whiting to Porter, Indiana, now NS
Michigan Central Railroad (NYC), Porter to Detroit, Michigan, Amtrak between Porter IN and Kalamazoo MI to the west and MDOT d/b/a Amtrak from Kalamazoo MI to Dearborn, minus CN track through Battle Creek and Conrail in Detroit
Detroit, Grand Haven and Milwaukee Railway (GT), Detroit to Pontiac, Michigan, now CN

Proposed improvements

High-speed rail
The Detroit-Chicago corridor has been designated by the Federal Railroad Administration as a high-speed rail corridor. A  stretch along the route of  Blue Water and Wolverine from Porter, Indiana to Kalamazoo, Michigan is the longest segment of track owned by Amtrak outside of the Northeast Corridor. On May 25, 2021 the federally approved accelerated-speed rule went into effect along the corridor from Kalamazoo to Albion.

Expansion 
The Michigan Department of Transportation has petitioned Amtrak to add a daily train between Chicago and Kalamazoo, departing Chicago in late evening and returning from Kalamazoo in the morning. Amtrak operated an extra frequency during the Labor Day weekend in 2010. The trains, 356–357, left Kalamazoo at 5:50 am and returned from Chicago at 10:00 pm.
In 2013 Amtrak ran special holiday trains, numbers 356 & 359 out of Chicago to Ann Arbor. These trains arrived in Ann Arbor at 3pm and departed west an hour later at 4pm. There are proposals to establish passenger service between Detroit and Grand Rapids via Lansing.

References

External links
Michigan Services Train
Amtrak Michigan Services
Michigan Association of Railroad Passengers

Amtrak routes
Passenger rail transportation in Michigan
Passenger rail transportation in Indiana
Passenger rail transportation in Illinois